Julius Caesar Concepcion Babao (born July 15, 1968) is a Filipino broadcast journalist, radio commentator and former talk show host for the Philippine television stations ABS-CBN & TV5. He is most notable for anchoring TV Patrol from April 21, 2003 to November 5, 2010, Bandila from November 22, 2010 to March 17, 2020, and Frontline Pilipinas since February 7, 2022.

Career
Babao started out his career as a production assistant in GMA Network's DZBB-AM in 1990.

Through hard work and perseverance he was soon promoted as a radio reporter and a contributor for GMA News. In 1993, Babao left GMA for ABS-CBN where he worked as a television reporter for TV Patrol. That same year, he was tapped by the management of ABS-CBN News to be a standby anchor for Frankie Evangelista in TV Patrol.

In 1996, Babao was given his own show Alas Singko Y Medya which he hosted with his future wife Christine Bersola-Babao until 2001.

The couple then went on to host a daily morning talk-show called Talk TV, which lasted from 2001 to 2002.

In April 2003, Babao transitioned into the weekday edition of the station's flagship news program TV Patrol and joined Korina Sanchez as its anchors.

In 2004, he and his wife launched a morning radio program for DZMM entitled Magandang Morning with Julius and Tintin. Their morning radio program would be combined with Radyo Patrol Balita: Alas Siyete, the newscast they are anchoring every weekend, similar to Kabayan. In 2006, he was appointed as one of the hosts of public-affairs program XXX: Exklusibong, Explosibong, Exposé where they investigate anomalies and irregularities of public and private practices in the Philippines, he normally joins the field and/or entrapment operations conducted by the law enforcement agencies.

Babao left TV Patrol alongside Karen Davila on November 5, 2010, to anchor the late evening top newscast, Bandila.

On January 10, 2011, he began anchoring Aksyon Ngayon with Kaye Dacer and Radyo Patrol Balita: Alas Dose, both airing every weekdays.

On January 2, 2017, Babao began hosting the new daily radio show, Lingkod Kapamilya, replacing Aksyon Ngayon, with Bernadette Sembrano and continued to anchored a daily newscast Radyo Patrol Balita: Alas Dose on DZMM before it got merged with Headline Pilipinas, where he joined Tony Velasquez as the anchor. He is also the weekend anchor of TeleRadyo's newscast TeleRadyo Balita (formerly Radyo Patrol Balita: Alas Siyete) alongside Zen Hernandez.

He also hosted Mission Possible, an award-winning advocacy show which airs every Monday evenings and Saturday mornings.

On September 7, 2020, he returned to TV Patrol as an occasional replacement for Ted Failon after the latter's departure and later as a relief anchor for Noli de Castro and Henry Omaga-Diaz on the weekday edition and on the weekend edition for Alvin Elchico.

On December 31, 2021, after 28 years with television giant ABS-CBN, he announced that he would be leaving the network as part of its retrenchment program caused by the ABS-CBN shutdown from the Philippine Congress that junked the new ABS-CBN legislative franchise to operate. He made his final appearance on TV Patrol as a relief anchor and two days later on TeleRadyo Balita.

In January 2022, Babao joined TV5 to anchor the network's primetime newscast Frontline Pilipinas starting on February 7, 2022, replacing Raffy Tulfo. He is the main anchor alongside former Alas Singko Y Medya and Magandang Umaga, Bayan anchor Cheryl Cosim, coinciding with the latter's birthday on that day. On March 21, 2022, Julius & Tintin: Para Sa Pamilyang Pilipino, which he hosts alongside his wife, debuted on Radyo5 92.3 News FM and One PH. The latter program was concluded in January 2023 on Radyo5 92.3 News FM and was replaced by Sagot Kita, hosted by Cheryl Cosim. However, it still broadcasts on One PH.

Personal life
Julius Caesar Concepcion Babao is a graduate of Mass Communications, majoring in film and audio visual communication, from the University of the Philippines Diliman. He is married to his once former co-host Christine Bersola. They have a daughter named Antonia Julia Sofia (also known as Anya, b. 2005) and a son named Antonio Francesco (b. 2010).

The couple has also raised Siberian Huskies  namely Snow, Krystal, Kirby and Kamatz, to name a few.

Julius and Christine are also avid art collectors where their collection was mostly bought from the Boston Gallery owned by Dr. Joven Cuanang. In July 2008 at the advent of Julius’ 40th birthday, the couple auctioned-off paintings from 125 participating artists at the Pinto Art Gallery, the proceeds went to the development of the Art 40 Village located in Bagong Silang, Caloocan.

He is also a Hypebeast item collector, Streetwear collector (particularly those made by the brand Supreme) as well as a sneakerhead and he even has a YouTube channel dedicated to such lifestyle.

Controversy
In October 2005, news surfaced where Julius Babao was allegedly linked to a suspected terrorist named Tyrone del Rosario Santos (alias: Dawud Santos). The reports surfaced when Dawud was released by the authorities on April 22, 2008, and was said to leave the detention center in an ABS-CBN owned van with Babao. In an intelligence report, Babao has been suggested to have paid the bail bond or the very least guaranteed the bail in order to gain an exclusive interview with the suspect. An investigation team was put together by ABS-CBN to look into the allegations made by the ISAFP, no further charges was made, clearing Babao of any allegations.

Awards
Julius Babao was awarded best male newscaster in the 2008 PMPC Star Awards for TV, he also won again in 2009 from the same award-giving body, he also won best morning show host in the years 1999 and 2000 respectively from the same award-giving body. In 2008, Babao was also presented the student's choice of male news and public affairs host at the USTv Student's Choice Awards and he was also honoured as one of the most admired male TV Personalities for the 2008 Anak TV Seal, an award given annually by the Southeast Asian Foundation for Children and Television to kid-friendly TV programs and personalities considered to be good influence on children.
He was also a two time awardee of Most Outstanding Male News Presenter (2007 and 2009) of COMGUILD Center for Journalism.

References

External links
 

Living people
People from Dagupan
Filipino radio journalists
Filipino television news anchors
Filipino Roman Catholics
University of the Philippines Diliman alumni
ABS-CBN News and Current Affairs people
1968 births